Broadcasting House is the headquarters of the BBC, in Portland Place and Langham Place, London. The first radio broadcast from the building was made on 15 March 1932, and the building was officially opened two months later, on 15 May. The main building is in Art Deco style, with a facing of Portland stone over a steel frame. It is a Grade II* listed building and includes the BBC Radio Theatre, where music and speech programmes are recorded in front of a studio audience.

As part of a major consolidation of the BBC's property portfolio in London, Broadcasting House has been extensively renovated and extended. This involved the demolition of post-war extensions on the eastern side of the building, replaced by a new wing completed in 2005. The wing was named the "John Peel Wing" in 2012, after the disc jockey. BBC London, BBC Arabic Television and BBC Persian Television are housed in the new wing, which also contains the reception area for BBC Radio 1 and BBC Radio 1Xtra (the studios themselves are in the new extension to the main building).

The main building was refurbished, and an extension built to the rear. The radio stations BBC Radio 3, BBC Radio 4, BBC Radio 4 Extra and the BBC World Service transferred to refurbished studios within the building. The extension links the old building with the John Peel Wing, and includes a new combined newsroom for BBC News, with studios for the BBC News channel, BBC World News and other news programming. The move of news operations from BBC Television Centre was completed in March 2013.

The official name of the building is Broadcasting House but the BBC now also uses the term new Broadcasting House (with a small 'n') in its publicity referring to the new extension rather than the whole building, with the original building known as old Broadcasting House.

Construction
Construction of Broadcasting House began in 1928. Programmes transferred gradually to the building. On 15 March 1932, the first musical programme was given by the bandleader Henry Hall and the BBC Dance Orchestra. Hall also wrote and performed, with his dance band, Radio Times, the name of the BBC's schedule publication.

The first news bulletin was read by Stuart Hibberd on 18 March. The last transmission from Savoy Hill was on 14 May, and Broadcasting House officially opened on 15 May 1932. George Val Myer designed the building in collaboration with the BBC's civil engineer, M. T. Tudsbery. The interiors were the work of Raymond McGrath, an Australian-Irish architect. He directed a team that included Serge Chermayeff and Wells Coates and designed the vaudeville studio, the associated green and dressing rooms, and the dance and chamber music studios in a flowing Art Deco style.

The building is built in two parts. Dispensing with the oft-found central light-well of contemporary buildings this size, the central core containing the recording studios was a windowless structure built of brick. (Structural brick rather than steel framing was used in order to reduce noise transmission both from without and between studios.) The surrounding outer portion, designed for offices and ancillary spaces, is steel framed and faced using Portland stone. While the outer portion had plenty of windows, the inner core required special sound-dampened ventilation systems.

There were two areas where right of ancient lights would cause height restrictions. While the rights on the southern side ceased to be a problem after the owners of those rights gave concessions, the rights on the eastern side were dealt with by sloping the roof away from the street from the fourth floor up, which affected not only the floorplan of the structure but meant that the interior recording tower could not be continued up to the top floor. (Thus, one studio on the top floor was actually outside the central studio core structure.)

Underground structures, including a hundred-year-old sewer, also presented problems during construction. The building is above the Bakerloo line of the London Underground: the Victoria line was tunnelled beneath in the 1960s, and presented problems for construction of the Egton Wing (see below). Noise from passing trains is audible within the radio theatre, but generally imperceptible in recordings. The ground floor was fitted with floor-to-ceiling windows overlooking the street, as the BBC believed that to finance such a project (costing £25 million in today's money) they would need to let the ground floor as a retail unit. The rapid expansion of the BBC meant this never occurred.

The original building is a Grade II* listed building.

Renovation
Beginning in 2003, Broadcasting House underwent a major renovation during the BBC's W1 Programme, with the aim of refurbishing the building and combining a number of the BBC's operations in a new extension. This houses the television and radio operations of BBC News, relocated from Television Centre, and the BBC World Service, which relocated from Bush House on 12 July 2012. Many of the BBC's national radio stations are also broadcast from the building, with the exception of BBC Radio 5 Live and 5 Live Sports Extra which have moved to Salford Quays, and BBC Radio 2 and BBC Radio 6 Music which moved to new studios in nearby Wogan House in 2006 to make way for the renovation.

The building work was completed in two phases. It began with the demolition of two post-war extensions to the original building.

"The redevelopment was part of a wider cost-saving strategy to consolidate the BBC's property portfolio and centralise its London operation. This will ultimately produce savings of more than £700m over the remaining 21-year life of the BBC lease on Broadcasting House."

First phase

The first phase consisted of the renovation of the original building, which was starting to show its age and needed structural repair, and a new wing to the east.

In the old building the sloped "cat slide" slate roof was taken off and many of the rooms stripped back to their walls, although much of the Art Deco architecture was retained and preserved. Much of the work focused on the lower walls and ceilings, which did not include Art Deco features. The reception area was renovated to include a new desk, while retaining the message and statue as the attention piece. Many rooms had ceilings removed, such as the south tower, and new reinforcement joists were added.

The new Egton Wing is roughly the same shape as the main building, with a modern design and window arrangement but retaining features such as Portland stone. Towards the rear a large block was created in the side, mirroring that created in the main building when the sloping roof was removed.

The design of the extension, intended to equal the original in "architectural creativity", was carried out by MacCormac Jamieson Prichard. Construction was completed in 2005 and the refurbished Broadcasting House and the new Egton wing were opened by Queen Elizabeth II on 20 April 2006 as part of her 80th birthday celebrations. All areas of the Egton Wing were fully fitted out and completed by 2007.

In 2012, it was announced by the then Director-General Mark Thompson that the Egton Wing would be renamed the 'John Peel Wing' to commemorate the late Radio 1 disc jockey, whom he described as a "great radio talent". Thompson described the wing as a "fitting tribute to a man who personified so much of what the BBC stands for".

It houses BBC London, BBC Arabic Television and BBC Persian Television, together with the reception area for BBC Radio 1 and BBC Radio 1Xtra.

Second phase

The second phase was the creation of the large wing to the rear of the building, joining the two buildings, and creating a plaza between them. The original architects were replaced for not agreeing to cost-related revisions, as Sir Richard MacCormac was unwilling to sacrifice the quality of his design. Construction was completed by Bovis Lend Lease in 2010, and control handed over to the BBC in 2011. While the rebuilding process was under way, many BBC radio stations moved to other buildings near Portland Place.

The extension contains the BBC News and Journalism departments, and state-of-the-art technical equipment and new studios to house the BBC News bulletins on television, the BBC News Channel and BBC World News, the BBC Arabic Television service and the BBC Persian Television service. At the heart of this is a new newsroom, the largest live newsroom in the world.

A walkway above the newsroom allows the public to view the work of journalists, connecting the foyer to the Radio Theatre and a new café for staff and the public. Complemented by the outdoor plaza, which could act as an outdoor arena and theatre, this is designed to engage the public with the television and radio making process. The extension is glass-covered in the plaza area and curved to contrast both wings either side and to continue the glass on both sides high up the building. On the Portland Place side, it continues the same use of Portland stone and glass as with the John Peel Wing.

On Monday 18 March 2013 at 1 pm, following the BBC News Channel's final broadcast from Television Centre, the first news programme from Broadcasting House was aired: the BBC News at One, on BBC One and the BBC News Channel. BBC World News was the first of BBC's news services to move into the new building on Monday 14 January 2013, beginning with GMT at noon.

Queen Elizabeth II officially opened the extension on 7 June 2013. The second phase development won the 'Programme of the Year' award at the 2013 annual awards of the Association for Project Management.

Studios

Original
When built, Broadcasting House contained 22 radio studios for all programme genres, in the art-deco style with an emphasis on both looks and practicality. The practicality of the studios diminished rapidly as a result of the changing nature of broadcasting and changes in the required uses of the studios. These studios and their original intended roles were:

Current
Following the rebuild and refurbishment, several studios have been added and the studio structure changed dramatically. The current studios are:

Radio studios

Television studios 

Until programmes air information is subject to change. All times listed are either Greenwich Mean Time or British Summer Time depending on what is being used in London.

Artworks

The building showcases works of art, most prominently the statues of Prospero and Ariel (from Shakespeare's The Tempest) by Eric Gill. Their choice was fitting since Prospero was a magician and scholar, and Ariel a spirit of the air, in which radio waves travel. There was, reportedly, controversy over some features of the statues when built and they were said to have been modified. They were reported to have been sculpted by Gill as God and Man, rather than Prospero and Ariel, and that there is a small carved picture of a beautiful girl on the back of Prospero. Additional carvings of Ariel are on the exterior in many bas-reliefs, some by Gill, others by Gilbert Bayes. The reception area contains a statue of 'The sower' by Gill.

The statues of Prospero and Ariel have attracted controversy in recent years, in large part due to increasing evidence that Gill engaged in pedophilia, and that pedophilic motifs might be reflected in the statue. Despite pressure, the BBC has refused to remove the statue, citing Gill's status as one of the preeminent British artists of the 20th century. On 13 January 2022, the statue was vandalized by a man wielding a hammer, who also wrote “Time to go was 1989” and “noose all paedos” on the statue.

Several works of art were commissioned by the BBC for the refurbishment of Broadcasting House, at an overall cost of more than £4 million. Among these is World, a pavement artwork by the Canadian-born architect and artist Mark Pimlott. According to the BBC, the work "reflects the global dimension of the BBC’s broadcasting and consists of over 750 stone flags inscribed with place names from around the world, as well as those from history, mythology and fantasy. The artwork is enhanced by elegant steel lines of longitude and latitude, a subtle scheme of small embedded lights and some audio installation linked to key output from the World Service."

On the roof of the John Peel wing, mirroring the radio mast, is Breathing, a cone-shaped glass structure reaching into the sky to the same height as the mast. It was sculpted by Jaume Plensa as a memorial to journalists killed in the line of duty. It includes words from a poem by James Fenton and is illuminated day and night. At 10 pm daily, in line with the BBC News at Ten, a column of light shines  into the sky. It was officially unveiled on 16 June 2008, by the UN Secretary General Ban Ki-Moon.

Broadcasting House in literature
The earliest use of Broadcasting House as a setting in fiction would seem to be in the 1934 detective novel Death at Broadcasting House by Val Gielgud and Holt Marvell (Eric Maschwitz), where an actor is found strangled in Studio 7C. Broadcasting House is a central feature in Penelope Fitzgerald's novel Human Voices, published in 1980, where the lead characters work for the BBC during the Second World War. It is also the work place of Alexander Wedderburn in A. S. Byatt's 1995 novel Still Life, and Sam Bell in Ben Elton's 1999 novel Inconceivable, and also that of the evil nazi-sympathiser Ezzy Pound in Michael Paraskos's 2016 novel In Search of Sixpence. The building is well realised as a setting in Nicola Upson's 2015 mystery novel London Rain.

George Orwell 

The head of BBC history, Robert Seatter, has said George Orwell in his novel Nineteen Eighty-Four (1949), "reputedly based his notorious Room 101 from the novel "on a room he had worked in whilst at the BBC."

On 7 November 2017, a statue of Orwell, sculpted by the British sculptor Martin Jennings, was unveiled, outside Broadcasting House. The wall behind the statue is inscribed with the following phrase: "If liberty means anything at all, it means the right to tell people what they do not want to hear". These are words from his proposed preface to Animal Farm and a rallying cry for the idea of free speech in an open society.

MI5 involvement
In 1985 it was revealed by The Observer that MI5 had had a special office in the building from 1937 for the purpose of vetting BBC employees for national security purposes.

See also

 List of BBC properties
 BBC Television Centre
 Bush House
 Granada TV Studios, Manchester

References

External links 

 Broadcasting House – a potted history
 Old BBC Radio Broadcasting Equipment and Memories – Broadcasting House in 1932

 Cover of the 13 May 1932 issue of the Radio Times, depicting the newly opened Broadcasting House, by Adrian Hill

Art Deco architecture in London
BBC offices, studios and buildings
Buildings and structures completed in 1932
Buildings and structures in the City of Westminster
Cultural and educational buildings in London
Grade II* listed buildings in the City of Westminster
History of broadcasting
History of radio
Local mass media in London
Mass media company headquarters in the United Kingdom
Media and communications in the City of Westminster
Richard MacCormac buildings
Television studios in London